Cheonho-dong is a dong, neighbourhood of Gangdong-gu in Seoul, South Korea.

History 
Cheonho means "Thousand of Houses", because its geographical location was believed to be an ideal place to live based on the Feng shui theory. In addition, there is a historical site of Pungnaptoseong, which is a flat earthen wall built at the edge of the Han River in the Baekje Era. Cheonho-dong is the only place where a huge department store such as Hyundai Department Store is located in the area of Gangdong-gu. Cheonho station is a transfer point between Seoul Subway Line 5 and Line 8. Cheonho-dong is a 60-minute Limousine bus ride away from Incheon International Airport.

Red-light district
Although prostitution is illegal in Korea, there is a long-established red-light district in Cheonho, known as "Texas Village". Since the introduction of the law banning prostitution in 2004 the number of brothels has declined, however in late 2018 there were still dozens of brothels in the area.

Area Information 
Current Zip Code of Cheonho-dong is 134-020. 134 is for Gangdong-gu and 020 is for Cheonho-dong.

See also 
Administrative divisions of Seoul 
Administrative divisions of South Korea

References

External links
Gangdong-gu official website
Gangdong-gu map at the Gangdong-gu official website
 The Cheonho 1 dong Resident office

Neighbourhoods of Gangdong District
Red-light districts in South Korea